The Arab Futsal Cup is a futsal competition for Arab nations. It was first held in 1998.

History
The competition started in 1998 under the name of Arab Futsal Championship. From the 2021 edition, it was renamed to Arab Futsal Cup.

Results

 A round-robin tournament determined the final standings.

Ranking

General statistics

Participating nations

Legend

References

External links
 Arab Futsal Cup - goalzz.com
  Arab Futsal Cup - uafaonline.com

 
International futsal competitions
Union of Arab Football Associations competitions
Futsal competitions in Asia
Futsal competitions in Africa